Corkscrew is a computer program that enables the user to tunnel SSH connections through most HTTP and HTTPS proxy servers. Combined with features of SSH such as port forwarding, this can allow many types of services to be run securely over the SSH via HTTP connections.

Supported proxy servers:
 Gauntlet
 CacheFlow
 Internet Junkbuster
 Squid
 Apache's mod_proxy

References

External links
 Homepage at GitHub

Cryptographic software
Secure Shell